Andrea Benelli (born 28 June 1960) is a retired Italian skeet shooter. He competed at the 1988, 1992, 1996, 2000, 2004 and 2008 Olympics, and won a gold medal in 2004 and a bronze in 1996. In 2004, he and Marko Kemppainen finished with 149 hits out of 150, but Kemppainen missed first in the shoot-off. Benelli also won the individual world title in 1987 and 1990, placing second in 1986, and third in 1999. In 1996 he set two world records at 125/125 and 150/150.

Benelli owns and runs a Tourist Villa named Agriturismo Petrognano, located in Saint Ellero, Florence. It is a restored 18th-century farmhouse with a practice range behind it. His father Luciano was also a competitive shooter, who won the national title in 1977.

Olympic results

References

External links
 
 

1960 births
Living people
Italian male sport shooters
Skeet shooters
Olympic shooters of Italy
Olympic gold medalists for Italy
Olympic bronze medalists for Italy
Shooters at the 1988 Summer Olympics
Shooters at the 1992 Summer Olympics
Shooters at the 1996 Summer Olympics
Shooters at the 2000 Summer Olympics
Shooters at the 2004 Summer Olympics
Shooters at the 2008 Summer Olympics
Olympic medalists in shooting
Medalists at the 2004 Summer Olympics
Medalists at the 1996 Summer Olympics
Mediterranean Games silver medalists for Italy
Competitors at the 2005 Mediterranean Games
Mediterranean Games medalists in shooting
21st-century Italian people